Marubi National Museum of Photography , also known as Marubi Museum, is a museum in Shkodër, Albania.

At the center of the museum project is the legacy of the 'Photo-Studio Marubbi', founded in 1856 by Pietro Marubbi, an Italian painter and photographer who came and settled in Shkodër at the time. The activity of the studio over the years, was directed and enriched by three generations of photographers, until the early 1950s, time when Geg Marubi was forced to give oneself up to the communist collective anonymity, by joining other photographers in the photography unit of the former Repair-Services Cooperative.

In 1970 was founded the Marubi Photo-Studio with around 500,000 negatives in various techniques and formats. Later on, historical images from the archive were (in many cases) used to feed the communist propaganda machine. It was during this period that many of them appeared in the editions of the time manipulated and alienated.

The new museum, projected by the architectural studio Casanova + Hernandez, has been designed as a space which promote the dialogue between tradition and modernity, past and present. The heritage and tradition are emphasized by means of the restoration project of the historic building designed by Kole Idromeno – Albanian artist and architect, former student of Pietro Marubbi – while preserving its structural features.

History
From a Studio to an Archive and later a Museum of Photography

Italian Pietro Marubbi came to Albania in the second half of the 19th century. After passing the country from South to North, he moved to Shkodër. In that period, the city was flourishing and becoming an important center thanks to economic and cultural exchanges. Maybe the atmosphere in the city, encouraged him to start the art of photography and open his first studio.

As Pietro's first adjutants were the sons of his gardener Rrok Kodheli from the area of Zadrima who later continued the art of photography. His two sons, Mati Kodheli, who died at a very young age and his younger brother Kel Kodheli, went to Trieste in the “Sebastianutti & Benque” studio to learn the mastery and secrets of photography. Kel followed the path of his master, Pietro in the same field inheriting the studio and also his surname. The studio was continued by his son Gegë Kodheli (Marubi) who attended photography courses for some years and later the school for cinematography and photography of the Lumière brothers in France. What we note in the three generations of photographers is their desire to be contemporary and adapt to the time and the context from a socio-esthetic and technological point of view. In the same period, in Shkodër other photography studios were opened, most of them from the Marubi students. Here we can mention Dritëshkroja e Kolës (1886), Fotografija Pici (1924), Foto Jakova (1932), Foto Rraboshta (1943).

The Marubi atelier preserved its originality for over one century, but in the beginning of the 1950s it was handled to the communist anonymity joining other photographers in a cooperative. In a time when all private activities were prohibited, the last of the Marubi found it impossible to use, promote and preserve the work he and his predecessor had done, so in 1970 Gegē Marubi donated the family archive to the state. Other photographers of the city ateliers did the same. These photographers who were children when they studied in the “Dritëshkroja Marubi” became part of the Phototeque, not as students, but as authors of their own photography collection. The new Marubi Phototeque, a section of the City Museum administrated by the Municipality of Shkodër, was founded from an archive of almost half a million glass negatives. From 2003 the archive is under the direct supervision of the Ministry of Culture.

On May 9, 2016, the Marubi National Museum of Photography was inaugurated with the collection of the Marubi Phototeque.

Museum spaces 
The museum is organized on both floors of the building and is supported by the other two spaces next to them. The Marubi National; Photographic Museum has four interconnected parts with different functions but complementing one another.

 Temporary exhibition (ground floor): hosting exhibition organized each year by the museum
 Library and videolounge (ground floor): a space within the Museum which provides the visitor with supplementing information about the photographic archive and the exhibitions. For this purpose, different methods are combined in order to transmit by video, audio and books, the information displayed on the museum. The library provides information about the history of photography in Albania and in the world, Albanian photographers and the art techniques of photography. Touchscreens, integrated on glass windows in front of the courtyard provide access to information which otherwise is not available on the museum exhibitions.
 Permanent exhibion (first floor): organized around three thematic rooms related to the three members of the Marubi dynasty: Pietro Marubbi, Kel Marubi and Gege Marubi. Their biography is put into context with important events of Albania and the city of Shkodra
 Street exhibitor:  The museum goes beyond the borders of the building through its street expository which is used to promote the museum, the activities inside the museum and to draw the interest of numerous passersby walking on the main promenade of the city. The themes to be exhibited on this street expository will relate to the temporary exhibitions that will be organized in the museum.

Exhibition

Marubi collection 
- Dedë Jakova, Curated by Lek M. Gjeloshi, 18.09.2020

- Dynasty Marubi: A Hundred Years of Albanian Studio Photography, Curated by Kim Knoppers, 15.02-02.06.2019

- Angjelin Nenshati. A witness between two ephocs, Curated by Luçjan Bedeni & Lek M.Gjeloshi, 22.06.-01.10.2018

- Manipulation, Curated by Luçjan Bedeni, 03.08. -10.10.2017

- Long live!, Curated by Blerta Hoçia, 21.04-23.09.2017

- The Two Roads of Idromeno, Curated by Adrian Paci, 26.01. -20.04.2017

Albanian photographic collections 
- Photographers of Southeastern Albania, Curated by Gjergj Spathari, 07.06-27.10.2019

- Marubi celebrates the originals, Curated by Rudolf Schäfer, 11.04. -30.07.2017

- The meeting tent of a courtyard, Curated by Luçjan Bedeni, 09.05.2016-20.01.2017

- Women from the Marubi archive, Kuruar nga Kim Knoppers, 09.05.2016-20.01.2017

International photography collections   
- Nadar. Rule and caprice, Curated by Michel Poivert, In collaboration with Jeu de Paume, Paris, 10.10.2018-03.02.2019

Albanian and international contemporary artistst 
- Armin Linke: A card or maybe two. Modalities of photography, Curated by Matteo Balduzzi, 11.01. -16.03.2020

- Seven Albanian photographers. A residency, Curated by François Cheval, 11.01.2019-07.01.2020

- Moira Ricci. Lookaftering, Curated by Lek M. Gjeloshi, 23.02-01.06.2018

- Lala Meredith-Vula. Wisdom now and forever, Curated by Monika Szewczyk, 20.10.2017-21.01.2018

Traveling exhibitions 
- Atheist Museum, Curated by Luçjan Bedeni, PhEST International Festival of Art and Photography, Monopoli, 06.09-04.11.2019

- Marubi archive. The photographic ritual, Curated by Zef Paci, Triennale di Milano, 16.11 -09.12.2018

- Kolë Idromeno, Curated by Luçjan Bedeni & Lek M.Gjeloshi, PhEST International Festival of Art and Photography, Monopoli, 06.09-04.11.2018

- Dynasty Marubi: A Hundred Years of Albanian Studio Photography, Curated by Kim Knoppers, Foam Museum of Photography, Amsterdam, 16.09-27.11.2016

References

Articles about the museum 
Snapshot: 'Kel Marubi with his wife' by Kel Marubi, Financial Times, September 2016
Europese uithoek in beeld gebracht, Het Parool, September 2016
L'Albania di Marubi, Internazionale, 6.01.2017
Fixierte Zeit, Art – Das Kunstmagazin, April 2017
L'Albania in un archivio di famiglia, Internazionale, 12.05.2017
Eintauchen in die Welt von gestern, Tiroler Tageszeitung, 4.05.2017
Massimiliano Tonnelli, Albania: Adrian Paci, curatore al nuovo Museo Marubi, Arttribune, 23.05.2017
Il testimone di due epoche, Internazionale, 25.07.2018
L'archivio Marubi, il rituale fotografico, Vogue Italia, 8.11.2018
Cent'anni di Albania, Internazionale, 15.11.2018
Looking at Photography now, European Society for the History of Photography, No.31, 2019
Luçjan Bedeni, Marubi Archive: Changing the history of Photography in Albania, MoMA

Articles about the exhibitions 
- Dynasty Marubi, A Hundred Years of Albanian Studio Photography, Foam Museum, Amsterdam, 16.09 - 27.11.2016

- Kolë Idromeno, PhEST, Festival Internazionale di Fotografia e Arte, 2018

- L'archivio Marubi. Il rituale fotografico, Triennale di Milano, 16.11-9.12.2018

- Atheism Museum, PhEST, Festival Internazionale di Fotografia e Arte, 2019

Awards 
- Museum nominated for the EMYA 2017 (European Museum of the Year Award)

Works of art inspired by the Marubi archive 
- Anri Sala, Déjeuner avec Marubi,1997

Marubi
Marubi